Yangguang station is a subway station in Yuelu District, Changsha, Hunan, China, operated by the Changsha subway operator Changsha Metro. It entered revenue service on 28 June 2020.

History
The station started the test operation on 30 December 2019. The station opened on 28 June 2020.

Surrounding area
Sunshine 100 International New Town

References

Railway stations in Hunan
Railway stations opened in 2020
2020 establishments in China